Karpovsky (Russian: Карповский) is a rural locality (a settlement) and the administrative center of Novokarpovsky Selsoviet, Tyumentsevsky District, Altai Krai, Russia.

Karpovsky, Volgograd Oblast,  rural locality (a khutor) in Bocharovskoye Rural Settlement, Novoanninsky District, Volgograd Oblast, Russia
Karpovsky (surname)

See also

Karpovskaya (disambiguation)